The 8th Legislative Assembly of Saskatchewan was elected in the Saskatchewan general election held in June 1934. The assembly sat from November 15, 1934, to May 14, 1938. The Liberal Party led by James Garfield Gardiner formed the government. After Gardiner resigned to join the federal cabinet in November 1935, William John Patterson became party leader and premier. The Farmer-Labour Group, subsequently known as the Co-operative Commonwealth Federation and led by George Hara Williams, formed the official opposition.

John Mason Parker served as speaker for the assembly.

Members of the Assembly 
The following members were elected to the assembly in 1934:

Notes:

Party Standings 

Notes:

By-elections 
By-elections were held to replace members for various reasons:

Notes:

References 

Terms of the Saskatchewan Legislature